"Courageous" is a song by contemporary Christian music band Casting Crowns, released by Beach Street Records, Reunion Records, and Provident Label Group. Written by Mark Hall and Matthew West and produced by Mark A. Miller, it was released on July 19, 2011 as the first single from the band's 2011 album Come to the Well. Hall has said the inspiration for the song was at the National Day of Prayer breakfast in 2008. A rock, pop rock and soft rock song, it calls fathers to be better spiritual leaders.

"Courageous" was received positively by critics, many of whom praised the song as one of the best off of Come to the Well. It peaked at number one on the Billboard Hot Christian Songs and Christian AC Indicator charts and also peaked inside the top five on the Hot Christian Songs, Christian CHR, and Soft AC/Inspirational charts. It peaked at number four on the Billboard Bubbling Under Hot 100 Singles chart, which measures the top twenty-five singles that have not entered the Billboard Hot 100, and number sixteen on the Heatseekers Songs chart.

Background and recording
According to lead vocalist Mark Hall, the inspiration for "Courageous" came at the National Day of Prayer breakfast in 2008. Casting Crowns was performing at the event and Hall met with Alex Kendrick, who was also a part of the event. The two started talking about various topics until Hall told Kendrick about his church's Bible study program for fathers. Hall said that "our hearts just sort of joined on this passion to see men rise up and be the godly men of the house that God has called us to be". Kendrick mentioned that he wanted a song to be at the end credits of a movie and that "lit [Hall] up".

"Courageous" was written by Mark Hall and Matthew West and produced by Mark A. Miller. It was recorded and mixed by Sam Hewitt at Zoo Studio in Franklin, Tennessee, with additional vocals recorded at Eagle's Landing Studio in McDonough, Georgia. The song was mastered by Andrew Mendelson.

Composition

"Courageous" is a song with a length of three minutes and fifty-nine seconds. According to the sheet music published by Musicnotes.com, it is set common time in the key of F minor and has a tempo of 82 beats per minute.  Mark Hall's vocal range in the song spans from the low note of A3 to the high note of F5. A rock, pop rock, and soft rock song, "Courageous" features "jangling" guitars and a "muscular" guitar riff. Lyrically, it calls fathers to be better spiritual leaders; the song's bridge quotes the Book of Micah, calling the listener to "live justly and love mercy and walk humbly with your God".

Critical reception
"Courageous" was received positively by music critics. James Christopher Monger of Allmusic selected it as a 'Track pick' and felt it contributed to a strong opening for Come to the Well. Grace S. Aspinwall of CCM Magazine felt "Courageous" was one of the best tracks on the album. Tom Lennie of Cross Rhythms was less positive, calling the song "one of the least melodic tunes on offer on [Come to the Well]. Lindsay Williams of Gospel Music Channel felt the song demonstrated how Matthew West's songwriting on Come to the Well made the album better. Alex "Tincan" Caldwell of Jesus Freak Hideout felt the song was an "apt challenge to men of God in this world who maintain spectator lifestyles and live vicariously through television shows and sports teams" and said the bridge made the song "thought-provoking".

Release and chart performance
"Courageous" was released as a digital download on July 19, 2011 and to Christian AC, Christian CHR, and Soft AC/Inspirational radio on August 13, 2011. It debuted at number thirty-eight on the Billboard Hot Christian Songs chart for the chart week of August 27, 2011. It advanced to number eighteen in its second chart week and to number fifteen in its sixth week. In its eight chart week, it jumped from number eleven to number four. In its eleventh chart week, "Courageous" advanced to the number one position, which it held for a total of four consecutive weeks. It dropped to the number two position in its fifteenth chart week but returned to the number one position the following week. In total, "Courageous" spent twenty-seven weeks on the Hot Christian Songs chart.

It also peaked at number one on the Christian AC Indicator chart, number two on the Hot Christian AC chart, number three on the Soft AC/Inspirational and Christian CHR charts. It peaked at number four on the Bubbling Under Hot 100 Singles chart, which ranks the top twenty-five songs that have not reached the Billboard Hot 100, and at number sixteen on the Heatseekers Songs chart, which measures the top songs by artists who have never reached the top fifty on the Billboard Hot 100. "Courageous" was the twenty-ninth best-selling Christian song of 2011, also ranking on the 2011 year-end Hot Christian Songs and Hot Christian AC charts at number thirty-one and thirty-three, respectively.

Credits and personnel 
Credits adapted from the digital booklet for Come to the Well.

Casting Crowns
Hector Cervantes – electric guitar
Juan DeVevo – acoustic guitar, electric guitar
Melodee DeVevo – violin, background vocals
Megan Garrett – piano, keyboard, background vocals
Mark Hall – vocals
Chris Huffman – bass guitar
Brian Scoggin – drums

Production
Recorded at Zoo Studio in Franklin, Tennessee.
Additional vocals recorded at Eagle's Landing Studio in McDonough, Georgia.
Submixed at ShinShack Studio in Nashville, Tennessee.

Technical
Natthaphol Abhigantaphand - mastering
Shelley Anderson - mastering
Daniel Bacigalupi - vocal recording
David Davidson - string arrangements
Michael France - vocal recording
Eric Jackson - vocal recording
Terry Hemmings - executive producer
Michael Hewitt - recording, digital editing
Sam Hewitt - recording, mixing
Billy Lord - vocal recording
Jason McArthur - A&R
Mark A. Miller - producer
Andrew Mendelson - mastering
Matt Naylor - recording, digital editing

Charts

Weekly charts

Year-end charts

Certifications

Release and radio history

References

External links
"Courageous" Music Video

Casting Crowns songs
2011 singles
Songs written by Matthew West
Songs written by Mark Hall (musician)
2011 songs
American pop rock songs
American soft rock songs